Lukáš Melich (born 16 September 1980 in Jilemnice) is a male hammer thrower from the Czech Republic. His personal best throw is 80.28 metres, achieved in 2013 in Szczecin.

Achievements

External links
 
 
 

1980 births
Living people
Czech male hammer throwers
Athletes (track and field) at the 2008 Summer Olympics
Athletes (track and field) at the 2012 Summer Olympics
Athletes (track and field) at the 2016 Summer Olympics
Olympic athletes of the Czech Republic
World Athletics Championships athletes for the Czech Republic
World Athletics Championships medalists
People from Jilemnice
Sportspeople from the Liberec Region